Mabel Coleman Reid (died 9 November 1969), also known by the Samoan name Sinaitaaga, was an American Samoan politician. In 1953 she was one of the first two women elected to the Fono, when she won a seat in the House of Representatives.

Biography
Reid was one of ten children of American Navy sailor William Patrick Coleman and his Samoan wife Amata C. Kreuz, Her brother Peter later served as Governor of American Samoa. She was educated at the Sacred Hearts Academy in Hawaii, and became a stenographer and clerk of the High Court of American Samoa. She married Peter E. Reid, and had two children, Peter and Mabel. In 1947 she became an agent for the new Samoan Area Airways, set up by her brother Lawrence. She also became High Chief of Tali in Pago Pago. 

In the 1953 legislative elections, Reid contested the Maʻopūtasi County seat in the House of Representatives, and was one of two women elected to the House alongside Zilpher Jennings. Although she lost her seat to Puiai Tufele in the 1954 elections, she defeated Tufele in the 1956 elections, the only woman to win a seat in the 1956 elections. During her second term she served as chair of the Ways and Means committee and as Acting Speaker of the House. She was re-elected in 1958, remaining in office until the end of the sixth legislature.

Reid died in November 1969.

References

Year of birth unknown
American Samoan civil servants
American Samoan women in politics
Members of the American Samoa House of Representatives
American Samoan chiefs
1969 deaths